A penumbral lunar eclipse took place on 5 July 2020, the third of four lunar eclipses in 2020.

Visibility 

The eclipse was visible during moonrise from some parts of North America, some parts of the Pacific Ocean and New Zealand, completely visible in Central and South America, some parts of North America, some parts of Western Africa as well as the extreme part of the South-West coast of South Africa, and visible during moonset from southwestern Europe, most of Africa (except Somalia, Djibouti, Eritrea and a strip of North Eastern Sudan, Egypt and Ethiopia), and some parts of the Indian Ocean.

Gallery

Related eclipses

Eclipses of 2020 
 A penumbral lunar eclipse on 10 January.
 A penumbral lunar eclipse on 5 June.
 An annular solar eclipse on 21 June.
 A penumbral lunar eclipse on 5 July.
 A penumbral lunar eclipse on 30 November.
 A total solar eclipse on 14 December.

Lunar year series

Saros series 
It is part of Saros cycle 149.

Half-Saros cycle
A lunar eclipse will be preceded and followed by solar eclipses by 9 years and 5.5 days (a half saros). This lunar eclipse is related to two partial solar eclipses of Solar Saros 156.

See also 
List of lunar eclipses and List of 21st-century lunar eclipses

References

External links 
 
 Hermit eclipse: Saros cycle 149
 Hermit eclipse: 5 Jul 2020  - Penumbral Lunar Eclipse

2020-07
2020 in science
July 2020 events